Pietrzykowice  is a village in the administrative district of Gmina Łodygowice, within Żywiec County, Silesian Voivodeship, in southern Poland. The village has a population of 4,279.

It is one of the oldest villages in Żywiec Basin. It was established in the 13th century, and in the early 14th century belonged to the Cistercian monastery in Rudy.

References

Pietrzykowice